Saindon is a surname. Notable people with the surname include:

 Eric Saindon, American visual effects supervisor
 Pat Saindon (born 1961), American football player
 Pierre Saindon, Canadian make-up artist and educator
 Zoël Saindon (1919–1998), Canadian politician